Koy Maeng is a commune (khum) of Mongkol Borei District in Banteay Meanchey Province in northwestern Cambodia.

Villages

 Koy Maeng
 Sdei Leu
 Phlov Siem
 Ta Nong
 Angkar Khmau
 Kasang Thmei
 Stueng Chas
 Sdei Kraom

References

Communes of Banteay Meanchey province
Mongkol Borey District